Smile Train is a nonprofit organization and charity providing corrective surgery for children with cleft lips and palates. Headquartered in New York City and founded in 1999, Smile Train provides free corrective cleft surgery in 87 countries, training local doctors and providing hospital funding for the procedures.

History
Smile Train was created in 1998 by Brian Mullaney and Charles Wang, who had previously worked with Operation Smile, another charity focused on correcting cleft lips and palates. They felt the most efficient way to provide cleft surgery was to train and support local doctors rather than to fly in Western doctors to provide surgeries in poor, developing countries. Local doctors would also be able to provide care year-round rather than the limited engagements of the "mission-based" model. In 1999, Smile Train approached Dr. Court B. Cutting of New York University's Virtual Research Laboratory to create training videos, which could be used to train local doctors on how to perform advanced cleft surgery techniques. The 3D models used in the videos were based on the CT scan of two Chinese patients. Smile Train distributes the DVDs to local doctors worldwide. The DVDs are available in English, Spanish, and Mandarin.

In 1999, Smile Train began providing corrective surgeries in China. The charity worked with the then-American and Chinese presidents, George H. W. Bush and Jiang Zemin, in the planning of Smile Train's first operation in China. 

Smile Train began working in India in 2000. In 2011, Aishwarya Rai, a Bollywood actress and former Miss World, became Smile Train's first goodwill ambassador.
In 2006, Smile Train co-founded the Pan African Congress on Cleft Lip and Palate. The charity also funded the 2008 Pan African Anaesthesia Symposium.

Early recognition and criticism
In a 2008 New York Times article, economist Steven Levitt of Freakonomics fame indicated that the organization's model and its technological innovations "likely make Smile Train one of the most productive charities, dollar for deed, in the world."

In 2009, the documentary Smile Pinki, which was sponsored by Smile Train and directed by Megan Mylan, won the 2008 Oscar for Best Documentary (Short Subject). The film shows the story of a poor girl in rural India whose life is transformed when she receives free surgery to correct her cleft lip. 

They worked with the Scottish charity KidsOR to revamp 30 operating theatres in Africa. This included three in Nigeria like the example in Kano where they have revamped a theatre there in the city's Armed Forces Specialist Hospital in 2022.

In 2008, Charity Watch criticized then-president Brian Mullaney's $420,209 salary and questioned the 2007 company's tax form, which said Mullaney's salary came from temporary restricted funds designed to go toward overhead. In 2009, Givewell could not assess the impact of Smile Train's activities based on the charity's 2008 tax form and other publicly accessible information. Mullaney departed the charity in 2012.

Smile Train today

Smile Train is a world leading charity in its field of facilitating corrective surgery for children born with facial disfigurement through funding local training and capacity.

See also
List of cleft lip and palate organisations
List of non-governmental organizations in the People's Republic of China

References

Charities based in New York City
Children's charities based in the United States
Health charities in the United States
Non-profit organizations based in New York City
Oral and maxillofacial surgery organizations
Organizations established in 1999
Medical and health organizations based in New York (state)
1999 establishments in New York (state)